Umro Ayyar is a fictional character from eastern literature lives in Tilism-e-Hoshruba which is included in the Hamzanama. He was first written about in the during the time of Mughal Empire King Jalaluddin Akbar. Many stories and novels have been written about him.

Many authors like Zaheer Ahmed, Mazhar Kaleem M.A Safdar Shaheen and Akhter Rizvi have been written story books about him.

Plot
Umro Ayyar is a thief and most famous character of Dastan-e-Amir Hamza after Amir Hamza. He's known for his cleverness and theft in the city 'Tilism-e-Hoshruba'. His life is full of adventure. It is his habit to travel around the world and to face evils and bad spirits. 
Umro has a Zambeel from which he can extract whatever he wants. He mostly use it to show off and to kill evils. He used to steal and help the needy people.

In fiction

Films

Animated films

Dramas

Other Books

References

 
Fictional thieves